Leucinodes is a genus of moths of the family Crambidae. It was first described by Achille Guenée in 1854.

Leucinodes species have been documented as eggplant fruit borers. They are occasionally imported by accident from African and Asian countries and pose medium threats to Solanaceae crops.

Species

Leucinodes africensis Mally et al., 2015
Leucinodes bilinealis Snellen, 1899
Leucinodes cordalis (Doubleday, 1843)
Leucinodes diaphana (Hampson, 1891)
Leucinodes erosialis Pagenstecher, 1884
Leucinodes ethiopica Mally et al., 2015
Leucinodes grisealis (Kenrick, 1912)
Leucinodes kenyensis Mally et al., 2015
Leucinodes labefactalis Swinhoe, 1904
Leucinodes laisalis (Walker, 1859)
Leucinodes malawiensis Mally et al., 2015
Leucinodes melanopalis Guenée, 1854
Leucinodes orbonalis Guenée, 1854
Leucinodes perlucidalis Caradja in Caradja & Meyrick, 1933
Leucinodes pseudorbonalis Mally et al., 2015
Leucinodes raondry (Viette, 1981)
Leucinodes rimavallis Mally et al., 2015
Leucinodes sigulalis Guenée, 1854
Leucinodes ugandensis Mally et al., 2015
Leucinodes unilinealis Snellen, 1899

Former species
Leucinodes apicalis Hampson, 1896, currently placed in Analyta
Leucinodes aureomarginalis Gaede, 1916, currently placed in Lygropia
Leucinodes hemichionalis (Mabille, 1900), currently placed in Syllepte
Leucinodes translucidalis Gaede, 1917, now considered a synonym of Leucinodes laisalis
Leucinodes vagans (Tutt, 1890), currently placed in Syllepte

Taxonomy
Hyperanalyta Strand, 1918 was formerly treated as a synonym of Leucinodes, but was found to be a synonym of Analyta Lederer, 1863.

References

Spilomelinae
Crambidae genera
Taxa named by Achille Guenée